Carmine Gallone (10 September 1885 – 11 March 1973) was an early Italian film director, screenwriter, and film producer, who was also controversial for his works of pro-Fascist propaganda and historical revisionism. Considered one of Italian cinema's leading early directors, he directed over 120 films in his fifty-year career between 1913 and 1963.

Life and career
Carmine Gallone was born as Carmelo Camillo Gallone on 10 September 1885 in Taggia (in the province of Imperia), but grew up in Naples. His father was Italian, from Sorrento, and his mother was French, from Nice. He began writing plays at 15 and in 1911 won first prize at a national drama competition for his drama Brittanico.

He later moved to Rome where in 1912 he was hired as a general worker by the Teatro Argentina company, all the while continuing to write plays. In the same year he had his first experience working in film at the Cines studio. In 1912 he also met and married the Polish actress Stanisława Winawerówna, better known to the public as Soava Gallone, whom he directed in  many of his films.

Promoted to director at Cines, he directed thirteen titles in 1914 alone, including Amore senza veli, Il romanzo di un torero, La donna nuda and Le campane di Sorrento. In 1915 he was selected to direct the film Avatar.

In 1918 he made his most successful film to date, Redenzione (Redemption) for the Medusa Film company. The film had a great success with audiences and critics. In 1924, together with Augusto Genina he directed Il corsaro. The following year due to the Italian film industry's troubles Gallone moved abroad where he worked for many years in France, Germany, England and Austria.

Due to his predilection for historical epics he was compared to Cecil B. DeMille. His best remembered films like Gli ultimi giorni di Pompei (The Last Days of Pompeii) in 1926 and many years later, the massive epic Scipione l'Africano in 1937, were used to enhance the imperial aspirations of the Mussolini regime, through the depiction of the greatness of ancient Rome. About Scipio l'Africano, Gallone is said to have remarked "If the film does not please il Duce I will shoot myself." The film in fact did not impress Mussolini, but still premiered at the Venice Film Festival and was quite successful. In 1943 he made Harlem, set in the US and critical about the American lifestyle, with afro-American and colonial British war prisoners employed in extra roles as colored characters.

Gallone also had a passion for making films that were linked to, or inspired by, the world of opera. These include Casta Diva (1935), Il sogno di Butterfly (Butterfly's Dream) (1939 and the remake of 1954) and Puccini (1953).

After the revival of Italian film Gallone went back to work at home permanently in 1940. He directed not only more historical films like Messalina (1951) and Cartagine in fiamme (1960), but also some comic films in the Don Camillo series starring Fernandel and Gino Cervi. The comedy
Carmen di Trastevere, made in 1963, was the last film of his long career.  Having directed more than one hundred films, Gallone is noted as one of the most prolific filmmakers in the history of Italian cinema, active both in the silent and sound eras.

Selected filmography

Il bacio di Cirano (1913)
The Naked Truth (1914)
Senza colpa! (1915)
Flower of Evil (1915)
The Wedding March (1915)
Sotto le tombe (1915)
Avatar (1916)
La falena (1916)
Malombra (1917)
The Thirteenth Man (1917)
La storia di un peccato (1918)
 Redemption (1919)
A Doll Wife (1919)
The Sea of Naples (1919)
On with the Motley (1920)
Nemesis (1920)
Marcella (1921)
All'ombra di un trono (1921)
S. E. l'Ambasciatrice (1922)
La fanciulla, il poeta e la laguna (1922)
Il corsaro (1923)
The Faces of Love (1924)
The Fiery Cavalcade (1925)
The Last Days of Pompeii (1926)
The City of a Thousand Delights (1927)
Pawns of Passion (1928)
Land Without Women (1929)
Ship in Distress (1929)
The Singing City (1930)
Un soir de rafle (1931)
 City of Song (1931)
Di notte a Parigi (1931)
My Cousin from Warsaw (1931)
A Son from America (1932)
Sailor's Song (1932)
Going Gay (1933)
My Heart Calls You (1934)
Two Hearts in Waltz Time (1934)
My Heart Is Calling You (1934)
My Heart is Calling (1935)
E lucean le stelle (1935)
Casta Diva (1935) 
If It Were Not for Music (1935)
The Divine Spark (1935)
Al sole (1936)
Thank You, Madame (1936)
 Mother Song (1937)
Scipio Africanus: The Defeat of Hannibal (1937)
Un dramma al circo (1938)
Giuseppe Verdi (1938)
Solo per te (1938)
Marionette (1939)
 (1939)
 The Dream of Butterfly (1939)
Eternal Melodies (1940)
Manon Lescaut (1940)
 Love Me, Alfredo! (1940)
 Beyond Love (1940)
The Secret Lover (1941)
First Love (1941)
The Two Orphans (1942)
The Queen of Navarre (1942)
Odessa in Flames (1942)
Sad Loves (1943)
Harlem (1943)
The Song of Life (1945)
Biraghin (1945)
Before Him All Rome Trembled (1946)
 (1946)
Addio Mimì (1947)
 The Lady of the Camellias (1947)
The Legend of Faust (1949)
 (1949)
The Force of Destiny (1950)
Night Taxi (1950)
Messalina (1951)
Puccini (1952)
We're Dancing on the Rainbow (1952)
Fatal Desire (1953)
Madame Butterfly (1954)
House of Ricordi (1954)
Casta Diva (1954) 
 Mata Hari's Daughter (1954)
Don Camillo's Last Round (1955)
Michel Strogoff (1956)
Tosca (1956)
Polikuska (1958) 
Carthage in Flames (1959)
Don Camillo: Monsignor (1961)
Carmen di Trastevere (1962)
La monaca di Monza (1962)

References

External links
 
Carmine Gallone at Mymovies.it 

1885 births
1973 deaths
People from Taggia
20th-century Italian screenwriters
Italian male screenwriters
Italian film directors
Italian film producers
20th-century Italian male writers